POSCO Energy is the largest private energy producer in South Korea. It is a member of the POSCO consortium, and was established on November, 1969, in South Korea as the nation's first private electricity supplier. The main businesses are in coal-fired power generation, fuel cells, liquid natural gas (LNG), and off-gas power.

With the completion of construction on the Incheon LNG combined cycle power plant in 2012, POSCO Energy will have 3,300 MW of power generation facilities.

It is headquartered in Seoul, South Korea.

History

1969–1999 
 1969.03 Establishment of Kyung-In Energy Co., Ltd.(Joint venture of Hanwha Group & Union Oil U.S.)
 1972.02 Launched commercial operation of the LNG combined Power plant.(Incheon, Total 325MW)
 1983.12 Withdrawal of Union Oil's share from Kyung-In Energy Co., Ltd.
 1999.12 Establishment of Hanwha Energy Co., Ltd. (Hived off from Hanwha Group's Energy Dept.)

2000–2006 
 2000.07 El Paso Natural Gas acquisition of a 50% share of the company
 2000.10 Company name changed to Korea General Energy Co., Ltd
 2002.01 Phased enlargement & launching LNG combined Power Plant (Incheon, total 1,800MW)
 2005.07 Acquisition of POSCO Co.Ltd. and Korea Energy Investment Ltd.(Acquired 50% each of Hanwha and El Paso's shares)
 2005.09 Company name changed to POSCO Power Corp.

 2006.03 Acquisition of 100% of POSCO., Ltd.

2007–present 
 2007.02 Initiated Fuel Cell business (transferred from POSCO Co., Ltd.)

 2008.09 Completion of Fuel Cell BOP manufacturing factory (Pohang, Yeonsan 100MW)

 2008.12 Completion of LNG combined Power Plant unit 5&6 (Total 3,000MW)

 2009.03 Inauguration of CEO Sung-sik Cho
 2009.06 Establishment of the Fuel Cell technology lab
 2009.11 Announcement of the "New Vision" for 40th anniversary
 2010.04 Completion of the Fuel Cell stack manufacturing factory (Pohang, Yeonsan 100MW)

 2010.12 Signed to Nevada (U.S) solar power plant (Boulder City. 300MW)

 2010.12 Completion of Gwangyang Off-gas Power Plant (Total 300MW)

 2011.02 Launch of Coal-fired Power Project in Vietnam (Mong Doung 2 project. 1200MW)
 2011.03 Founding of the Women's Table Tennis Club 

 2011.03 Completion of the Fuel Cell stack manufacturing factory
 2012.01 1st Completion of Shinan solar photovoltaic power generation 

 2012.02 Launch of saprophytism power plant in Pohang

 2012.02 Company name changed to POSCO Energy Corp.

 2012.03 Inauguration of CEO Chang-Gwan Oh.

Operations

Subsidiaries 

 Pohang fuel cell Power Plant. Co,Ltd
 PSC Energy Global. Co,Ltd
 Sin-An Energy. Co,Ltd
 Posco E&E. Co,Ltd

Power plant
 Incheon LNG Power
 Plant Unit 1 to 4
 Plant Unit 5, 6
 Gwangyang Off-gas power
 Pohang Off-gas power

New projects
 Green Project (solar power plant in Boulder City, Nevada, US / solar power plant in Sin-an City)
 Global IPP Project (Vietnam Mong Duong II Coal-Fired Power Plant Project / Indonesia CSP Off-gas power Project)

References

External links 
 Posco Energy

Electric power companies of South Korea
POSCO